Namacunde or Namakunde is a town and municipality in Cunene Province in Angola. The municipality had a population of 142,047 in 2014.

History as a mission station

Namacunde mission was founded in 1900 by the German missionary Wilhelm Ickler. At the time it was thought that the area was part of German South West Africa. Just as Ickler had begun the construction of the third mission German mission station in Oukwanyama, he fell ill with malaria and blackwater fever and died on 22 June 1900.

In November 1915 the Germans had to leave Namacunde, as it became the border station between Portuguese West Africa and British South West Africa.

Tourist attractions 

Oihole

Transport 

Namakunde lies on the route of the proposed railway linking Angola and Namibia.

See also 
Railway stations in Namibia

References 

Populated places in Cunene Province
Municipalities of Angola
Rhenish mission stations in Oukwanyama